Whole Terrain: Journal of Reflective Environmental Practice is an environmentally-themed literary journal that is published approximately once a year by Antioch University New England (ANE). Each volume explores emerging ecological and social issues from the perspectives of practitioners working in the environmental field. The editor position is open to current ANE students as a practicum experience.

History and profile
Whole Terrain was founded in 1992 by the efforts of Antioch faculty and administration, including Mitchell Thomashow and Eleanor Falcon. The editor of Whole Terrain Volume 1: Environmental Identity and Professional Choices, was current Orion editor, H. Emerson Blake.

Themes 

Heresy (Volume 20 2012/2013)
Net Works (Volume 19 2011/2012)
Boundaries (Volume 18 2010/2011)
Significance of Scale (Volume 17 2009/2010)
((r)e)volution (Volume 16 2008/2009)
Where is Nature? (Volume 15 2007/2008)
Celebration and Ceremony (Volume 14 2005/2006)
Risk (Volume 13 2004/2005)
Resilience (Volume 12 2003/2004)
Gratitude and Greed (Volume 11 2002/2003)
Surplus and Scarcity (Volume 10 2001/2002)
Serious Play (Volume 9 2000/2001)
Legacy and Posterity (Volume 8 1999/2000)
Transience, Permanence and Commitment (Volume 7 1998/1999)
Creative Collaborations (Volume 6 1997/1998)
Research as Real Work (Volume 5 1996/1997)
Exploring Environmental Stereotypes (Volume 4 1995/1996)
Environmental Ethics at Work (Volume 3 1994)
Spirituality, Identity and Professional Choices (Volume 2 1993)
Environmental Identity and Professional Choices (Volume 1 1992)

Contributors 
Contributors to Whole Terrain include:

Rick Bass
Thomas Berry
Kenneth Boulding
David Brower
Steve Chase
John Elder
J Henry Fair
Bernd Heinrich
bell hooks
Sabine Hrechdakian
Lewis Hyde
Stephanie Kaza
Daniel Kemmis
Robin Wall Kimmerer
Michael Klare
Patricia Monaghan
Thomas Moore
Gary Nabhan
Howard Nelson
Janisse Ray
Pattiann Rogers
Paul Slovic
David Sobel
John Tallmadge
Tom Wessels
Terry Tempest Williams

See also
 Nature writing

References

External links
 Review of Whole Terrain Volume 3: Environmental Ethics at Work
 SEJ: Environmental Journalism Programs and Courses

Whole Terrain on the Web
 Whole Terrain main site
 Whole Terrain "Where is Nature?" Virtual Art Gallery

Whole Terrain Articles on the Web
 Dance Fever by Michael P. Branch, from Utne, first published in Whole Terrain Volume 9 as More Than Just Watching
 Energetic Americans, from Utne Magazine, published in Whole Terrain Volume 10 as Are We Dreaming?
 Guerrilla Gatherers by Laird Christiansen, from Utne Magazine, first published in Whole Terrain Volume 11 as The Give and Take of Wildcrafting
 Hudson River Immersion by Dr Laird Evans Christiansen, first published in Whole Terrain Volume 13
 Marshfield: A Suburban Fairy Tale by Peggy Duffy, first published in Whole Terrain Volume 10
 Mistaken Impressions of the Natural World by Stephanie Kaza, published in Whole Terrain Volume 4
 Practicing with Greed by Stephanie Kaza, published in Whole Terrain Volume 11

Annual magazines published in the United States
Environmental magazines
Literary magazines published in the United States
Magazines established in 1992
Magazines published in New Hampshire
Science and technology magazines published in the United States